Bo Ba Ko was one of the revolutionary leader in Fascist Japan Revolution and two-time Myanmar Academy Award winning film actor, military service, writer, film director, and University lecturer in Myanmar.

Early life and education 
Bo Ba Ko was born on 11 December 1919 in Mandalay to U Than and Daw Tint. In 1941, he achieved the Academy of Arts (Honors) from the University of Yangon by the first phase.

Later he joined the Burmese Independence Army and was involved in the struggle for independence. He had retired as Major army in 1951 after independence. He had been received Zayakyawhtin Medal and Wannakyawhtin Medal by the government.

After, he received a law degree. In 1955, he received a master's degree from The United States Yale University. In 1958, he received the Star of Independence (the second tier) due to be carried out seeking independence.

Career
In Myanmar, he became actor at first Panorama film of Hollywood. In 1970 and 1971, he won the Myanmar Academy Awards for the "Thida Pyone"(Thida smile) and "Turn the World"(Ta Kwae Ta Kabar) movies.
Since 1976, he had worked as the vice president of the organizing committee of Film Council, as the external examiner
of Yangon University, Mandalay University, Pathein University and Mawlamyine College. And then, he served as Linguistics teacher at the Myanmar Department of University of Yangon.

Death
He died at Yangon on 22 June 1985 at the age of 65.

Popular movies

Awards and nominations

References
ပြန်ကြားရေးနှင့် ပြည်သူ့ ဆက်ဆံရေး ဦးစီးဌာန စာတည်းအဖွဲ့

1919 births
1985 deaths
Burmese writers
People from Mandalay Region
Recipients of the Wunna Kyawhtin
Academic staff of the University of Yangon